Montana is a former municipality in the district of Sierre in the canton of Valais, Switzerland. It was one of the six municipalities that form the ski resort Crans-Montana (together with Icogne, Lens, Randogne, Mollens and Chermignon).  On 1 January 2017 the former municipalities of Chermignon, Mollens (VS), Montana and Randogne merged to form the new municipality of Crans-Montana.

History
Montana is first mentioned in 1243 as Montana.  In 1905 it separated from Lens to form an independent municipality.

Geography

Of this area,  or 25.8% is used for agricultural purposes, while  or 42.5% is forested.

Of the built up area, housing and buildings made up 15.5% and transportation infrastructure made up 8.2%. while parks, green belts and sports fields made up 3.5%.  Out of the forested land, 38.9% of the total land area is heavily forested and 3.7% is covered with orchards or small clusters of trees.  Of the agricultural land, 0.6% is used for growing crops and 12.5% is pastures, while 10.4% is used for orchards or vine crops and 2.2% is used for alpine pastures.  All the water in the municipality is in lakes.  Of the unproductive areas,  and 1.2% is too rocky for vegetation.

The former municipality is located in the Sierre district, above the right bank of the Rhone.

Coat of arms
The blazon of the municipal coat of arms is Gules, two crosiers Or in saltire over those issuant from Coupeaux vert a Pine-tree of the same trunked Gules.

Demographics
Montana had a population of 2,363.  , 27.8% of the population are resident foreign nationals.  Over the last 10 years (2000–2010 ) the population has changed at a rate of -5.1%.  It has changed at a rate of -2.8% due to migration and at a rate of -0.8% due to births and deaths.

Most of the population speaks French (1,883 or 81.7%) as their first language, German is the second most common (125 or 5.4%) and Italian is the third (109 or 4.7%).

, the population was 49.0% male and 51.0% female.  The population was made up of 799 Swiss men (35.2% of the population) and 312 (13.8%) non-Swiss men.  There were 854 Swiss women (37.6%) and 304 (13.4%) non-Swiss women.  Of the population in the municipality, 820 or about 35.6% were born in Montana and lived there in 2000.  There were 493 or 21.4% who were born in the same canton, while 268 or 11.6% were born somewhere else in Switzerland, and 639 or 27.7% were born outside of Switzerland.

, children and teenagers (0–19 years old) make up 20.8% of the population, while adults (20–64 years old) make up 62% and seniors (over 64 years old) make up 17.2%.

, there were 903 people who were single and never married in the municipality.  There were 1,168 married individuals, 129 widows or widowers and 105 individuals who are divorced.

, there were 998 private households in the municipality, and an average of 2.2 persons per household.  There were 382 households that consist of only one person and 49 households with five or more people.  , a total of 874 apartments (39.8% of the total) were permanently occupied, while 1,284 apartments (58.5%) were seasonally occupied and 37 apartments (1.7%) were empty.  , the construction rate of new housing units was 0.9 new units per 1000 residents.  The vacancy rate for the municipality, was 1.56%.

The historical population is given in the following chart:

Heritage sites of national significance
The Hotel Bella Lui is listed as a Swiss heritage site of national significance.

Politics
In the 2007 federal election the most popular party was the CVP which received 42.96% of the vote.  The next three most popular parties were the SVP (18.8%), the SP (17.03%) and the FDP (12.83%).  In the federal election, a total of 872 votes were cast, and the voter turnout was 59.6%.

In the 2009 Conseil d'État/Staatsrat election a total of 758 votes were cast, of which 67 or about 8.8% were invalid.  The voter participation was 53.2%, which is similar to the cantonal average of 54.67%.  In the 2007 Swiss Council of States election a total of 848 votes were cast, of which 49 or about 5.8% were invalid.  The voter participation was 60.3%, which is similar to the cantonal average of 59.88%.

Economy

, Montana had an unemployment rate of 4%.  , there were 64 people employed in the primary economic sector and about 29 businesses involved in this sector.  206 people were employed in the secondary sector and there were 23 businesses in this sector.  1,054 people were employed in the tertiary sector, with 135 businesses in this sector.  There were 1,199 residents of the municipality who were employed in some capacity, of which females made up 46.3% of the workforce.

 the total number of full-time equivalent jobs was 1,141.  The number of jobs in the primary sector was 31, all of which were in agriculture.  The number of jobs in the secondary sector was 192 of which 28 or (14.6%) were in manufacturing and 163 (84.9%) were in construction.  The number of jobs in the tertiary sector was 918.  In the tertiary sector; 188 or 20.5% were in wholesale or retail sales or the repair of motor vehicles, 22 or 2.4% were in the movement and storage of goods, 272 or 29.6% were in a hotel or restaurant, 1 was in the information industry, 14 or 1.5% were the insurance or financial industry, 18 or 2.0% were technical professionals or scientists, 123 or 13.4% were in education and 166 or 18.1% were in health care.

, there were 1,250 workers who commuted into the municipality and 527 workers who commuted away.  The municipality is a net importer of workers, with about 2.4 workers entering the municipality for every one leaving.  Of the working population, 6.6% used public transportation to get to work, and 55% used a private car.

Religion
Of the rest of the population, there were 91 members of an Orthodox church (or about 3.95% of the population), and there were 23 individuals (or about 1.00% of the population) who belonged to another Christian church. There were 10 individuals (or about 0.43% of the population) who were Jewish, and 19 (or about 0.82% of the population) who were Islamic. There were 3 individuals who were Buddhist and 1 individual who belonged to another church.  87 (or about 3.77% of the population) belonged to no church, are agnostic or atheist, and 107 individuals (or about 4.64% of the population) did not answer the question.

Climate
Between 1991 and 2020 Montana had an average of 103.8 days of rain or snow per year and on average received  of precipitation. During this month there was precipitation for an average of 9.0 days. The month with the most days of precipitation was June, with an average of 10.3, but with only  of rain or snow. According to the Köppen Climate Classification system, Montana has a marine west coast climate, abbreviated "Cfb" on climate maps.

Education
In Montana about 744 or (32.3%) of the population have completed non-mandatory upper secondary education, and 356 or (15.4%) have completed additional higher education (either university or a Fachhochschule).  Of the 356 who completed tertiary schooling, 39.9% were Swiss men, 28.9% were Swiss women, 18.5% were non-Swiss men and 12.6% were non-Swiss women.  , there were 507 students in Montana who came from another municipality, while 144 residents attended schools outside the municipality.

References

External links
 Official website 

Former municipalities of Valais
Cultural property of national significance in Valais